Robert Lee Helms (August 15, 1933 – June 19, 1997) was an American country singer, who is best remembered for his 1957 Christmas hit "Jingle Bell Rock". Additionally, he had two other hit records from that year: "Fraulein" and "My Special Angel".

Life and career
Robert Lee Helms was born in 1933 in Bloomington, Indiana (some sources say nearby Helmsburg), the son of Hildreth Esther (née Abram) and Fred Robert Helms. His family was musical. Helms began performing as a duo with his brother, Freddie, before going on to a successful solo career in country music. In 1956, Helms made his way to Nashville, Tennessee, where he signed a recording contract with Decca Records, and achieved multiple successes the following year. His first single in 1957, titled "Fraulein", went to No. 1 on the country music chart and made it into the Top 40 on the Billboard Best Sellers in Stores chart. Later that same year, he released "My Special Angel", which also hit No. 1 on the country charts and entered the Top 10 on Billboards pop music chart, peaking at No. 7.

His song "Jingle Bell Rock", which was released in the late fall of 1957, produced by Paul Cohen was a big hit and was being played and danced to on Dick Clark's teen dance show American Bandstand by mid-December of that year. It also re-emerged in four out of the next five years, and sold so well that it repeated each time as a top hit, becoming a Christmas classic still played today. (In 2016, it was rated radio's third most-played Christmas song, according to StationIntel.) It took five years for the song to become a second million-seller for Helms. It reached No. 6 on the Billboard Hot 100 and spent 21 weeks on the chart.  The record gained gold disc status. At the end of a television performance of the song toward the end of his life, Helms said, “I didn’t want to do the song when they first brought it to me, but now I'm sure glad I did.” ASCAP and AllMusic list the writers of the song as Joseph Beal, Joseph Carlton, James Ross, and James Boothe.

Another record by Helms was "Schoolboy Crush", which was a hit in the UK. It was released in the United States on June 23, 1958, on Decca. The same song was then covered by UK teen star Cliff Richard about the same time as the UK release.

Helms continued touring and recording for the next three decades. His pioneering contribution to the genre has been recognized by the Rockabilly Hall of Fame.

Helms suffered from emphysema, asthma, diabetes, and stomach problems. He began wearing an eye patch after losing sight in his right eye. He spent most of his later years living just outside Martinsville, Indiana, until his death from complications from emphysema at the age of 63 on June 19, 1997.

He was portrayed by Brad Hawkins in the 2007 film Crazy.

Discography

Selected albums
 Sings to My Special Angel (Decca, 1957)
 I'm the Man (Kapp, 1966)
 Sorry My Name Isn't Fred (Kapp, 1966)
 All New Just for You (Little Darlin', 1968)
 Pop-a-Billy (MCA, 1983)

Singles

See also
 Billboard Hot 100 chart achievements and milestones

References

External links
 
 
 [ Helms biography at Allmusic website]

1933 births
1997 deaths
American country singer-songwriters
American male singer-songwriters
American male pop singers
Deaths from emphysema
Decca Records artists
20th-century American singers
Country musicians from Indiana
20th-century American male singers
Singer-songwriters from Indiana
People from Brown County, Indiana